Tirunelveli Lok Sabha constituency is one of the 39 Lok Sabha (parliamentary) constituencies in Tamil Nadu, a state in South India. Its Parliamentary Constituency number is 38.

Assembly segments
From 2009 General Elections, the Tirunelveli Lok Sabha Constituency composed of following 6 assembly segments:

Tirunelveli Lok Sabha constituency was initially composed of the following assembly segments (before 2009 elections): 
Vilathikulam
 Ottapidaram
 Tirunelveli
 Palayamkottai
 Tiruvaikuntam  
 Thoothukudi.

Members of the Parliament

Election results

General Election 2019

General Election 2014

General Election 2009

General Election 2004

See also
 Tirunelveli
 List of Constituencies of the Lok Sabha

References

External links
http://164.100.24.209/newls/lokaralpha.aspx?lsno=13
Tirunelveli lok sabha  constituency election 2019 date and schedule

Lok Sabha constituencies in Tamil Nadu
Tirunelveli district